Metroland was an alternative newspaper that was published weekly in Albany, New York and mainly served the Capital District area. Distributed free of charge, the paper offered local arts and music scene coverage, news and feature articles, and political columns with a mostly liberal bent. It billed itself as "The Capital Region's Alternative Newsweekly".

Every week, Metroland included an opinion column, several local news stories, a cover story, and a comprehensive calendar of events (with a movie clock). In addition, it had published reviews of movies, restaurants, concerts, recordings, art exhibitions, dance performances, and plays. Metroland columnists include Paul Rapp, Miriam Axel-Lute, and Jo Page. Regular syndicated features include This Modern World, Savage Love, Partially Clips, Slowpoke, and Free Will Astrology. The paper also published special features such as "Best of the Capital Region", Readers Poll, fashion issues, dining guides, and "Inside Saratoga".

Metroland was edited and published by Stephen Leon and was founded in 1978 by Peter Iselin. The newspaper was published by Lou Communications, Inc. and is a member of the Association of Alternative Newsweeklies.

On November 3, 2015, the New York State Department of Taxation and Finance seized its 279 Washington Avenue offices for unpaid back taxes of over $20,000. Since then, Metroland has ceased publication.

Editorial staff
Stephen Leon, managing editor and publisher
Shawn Stone, arts editor
Kathryn Geurin, associate editor
Josh Potter, assistant editor

Contributing Photographers

Martin Benjamin
Joe Putrock
Julia Zave
Leif Zurmuhlen

Relaunch as The Alt
On November 22, 2016, a new alternative weekly launched from Schenectady with a partnership and $500,000 in funding from that city's principal daily, The Daily Gazette. Its name is The Alt.

References

External links
Metroland Online
Metroland on Facebook
Glenn Weiser's writings for Metroland

Alternative weekly newspapers published in the United States
Newspapers published in Albany, New York